William R. Hess (February 5, 1923 – June 10, 1978) was an American college football coach. He served as the head football coach at Ohio University from 1958 to 1977. In his tenure as head coach for the Ohio Bobcats football team, Hess compiled a 108–91–4 record. He ranked second on Ohio's all-time victories list behind Hall of Famer Don Peden at the time of his retirement, though he has since been passed by Frank Solich. Hess's teams won four Mid-American Conference (MAC) championships (1960, 1963, 1967, and 1968) and won a National Small College Championship in 1960 after having an undefeated season. Hess also led the Bobcats to two bowl games, losing 15–14 to West Texas State in the 1962 Sun Bowl and losing 49–42 to Richmond in the 1968 Tangerine Bowl. His 1968 team is the only team in school history to finish ranked in the major polls. Hess was a native of Columbus, Ohio. He coached high school football in Portsmouth and Grandview Heights, Ohio before joining Woody Hayes's staff at Ohio State University in 1951.

Head coaching record

References

1923 births
1978 deaths
Ohio Bobcats football coaches
Ohio State Buckeyes football coaches
High school football coaches in Ohio
Sportspeople from Columbus, Ohio